Kvistgård station is a railway station serving the town of Kvistgård in North Zealand, Denmark.

The station is located on the Little North Line from Helsingør to Hillerød. The train services are currently operated by the railway company Lokaltog which runs frequent local train services between Helsingør station and Hillerød station.

See also
 List of railway stations in Denmark

External links
Lokaltog

Railway stations in the Capital Region of Denmark
Railway stations opened in 1864
Railway stations in Denmark opened in the 19th century